The United States House of Representatives elections in Idaho occurred on November 8, 2016. The state chose two individuals to represent Idaho in the U.S. House. Idaho's voting system is a mixed primary system. The Democratic Party permits unaffiliated voters to vote in the primary. The Republican Party grants registered voters the right to vote. Non-affiliated electors can choose to ally with a party on election day, however, they will be obligated to that party at the next election. The primaries were held on May 17.

District 1

Republican Raúl Labrador has represented Idaho's 1st congressional district since 2011.  Labrador won election to a third term in 2014, defeating State Representative Shirley Ringo of Moscow with 65% of the vote.

Republican primary

Results

Democratic primary

Results

General election

Results

District 2

Republican Mike Simpson has represented Idaho's 2nd congressional district since 1999. Simpson won reelection in 2014, defeating Former Congressman Richard H. Stallings with 61% of the vote.

Republican primary

Results

Democratic primary

Results

Constitution primary

Results

General election

Results

See also

 United States House of Representatives elections, 2016
 United States Senate election in Idaho, 2016

References

2016
Idaho
2016 Idaho elections